Frederick or Fred Watson may refer to:

 Frederick Beilby Watson (1773–1852), British courtier
 Fred Watson (Australian footballer) (1882–1968), Australian rules footballer
 Fred Watson (Scottish footballer) (1888–1917), Scottish footballer
 Fred Watson (Frederick Garnett Watson, born 1944), English-born astronomer and popular scientist in Australia
 Frederick Watson, pseudonym of John Leslie (director) (1945–2010), American pornographic film actor-director-producer